The first season of  the American talent show competition series America's Got Talent was broadcast on NBC from June 21 to August 17, 2006. The season went into production a year earlier than planned by Got Talent creator Simon Cowell. Cowell intended for Britain's Got Talent to debut before AGT in 2006. However, production was suspended due to internal conflicts within its British television network. David Hasselhoff, Brandy Norwood and Piers Morgan were the show's first judges, with Regis Philbin as host. This season originally had an early format for live round judging and Wildcard acts, which would be changed after the season's conclusion.

The first season was won by singer Bianca Ryan, with clogging dance group All That, and singer/musician duo The Millers finishing as runner-ups within the Top 3 finalists. The season's actual results for second and third place were not declared. The ratings success of this season helped foster the development of other international editions of the Got Talent franchise, along with restarting production on the British edition.

Season overview 

In 2005, Simon Cowell devised plans for a televised talent competition, originally intending for it be created and broadcast in Britain through the British broadcaster ITV, with an American edition to follow after its first season. However, following a pilot broadcast of the format, a dispute arose between ITV and Paul O'Grady, the originally intended host of Britain's Got Talent. In the wake of the dispute, after O'Grady decided to sign on to another network, Cowell suspended production on the British edition, and instead focused on the American edition in 2006. His proposal for his program in America was bought by NBC, who commissioned a small season of episodes, along with Fremantle and Cowell's own company Syco Entertainment. Auditions were launched across the United States, while Regis Philbin was picked as the host with David Hasselhoff, Brandy Norwood and Piers Morgan chosen as judges. After the open auditions had been completed, those who had been nominated for the program were entered into more an extensive round of major auditions, which took place across Los Angeles, Chicago and New York in April 2006.

The format used in the first season of America's Got Talent for live rounds differed greatly from what would later be used in later seasons of the program, as well as for other international editions of the Got Talent franchise. In the semi-finals and the final, the judges voted on each participant's performance pertaining to whether they approved or disapproved of an act, with no use of a buzzer to stop a performance at any time. While each semi-final would offer two places in the live final, any act eliminated by this stage would have a chance to be picked as a Wildcard for a special semi-final – two by each judge from any semi-final and one by the public from each round – with an additional two places offered.

Forty of the participants who auditioned for this season secured a place in the semi-finals, with ten performing in each show and eight of the acts making it into the live final. Approximately ten of the semi-finalists who didn't advance were chosen by the judges to compete within a Wildcard round and secured two additional places in the final. These are the results of each participant's overall performance during the season:

 |  |  | 

  These participants were entered into the Wildcard semi-final, after losing their initial semi-final.

Semi-final summary 
 Judge Disapproved |  Judge Approved
 | 
 |

Semi-final 1 (July 12) 
Guest Performer, Results Show: Teddy Geiger

  Each respective judge meant to vote their disapproval for the corresponding performance, but accidentally voted the opposite.

Semi-final 2 (July 19) 
Guest Performer, Results Show: Jurassic 5

  Norwood meant to vote her disapproval for this participant, but accidentally voted for the opposite.

Semi-final 3 (July 26) 
Guest Performer, Results Show: Cirque du Soleil

Semi-final 4 (August 2) 
Guest Performer, Results Show: Tom Green

Semi-final 5 - Wildcard Round (August 9)
Guest Performer, Results Show: Penn & Teller

Final (August 16) 
Guest Performers, Results Show: Aly & AJ, and Blue Man Group

 Judge Disapproved |  Judge Approved
 | 

  Actual position these acts finished in was not disclosed by the program.

References

2006 American television seasons
America's Got Talent seasons